Buślary  (German Buslar) is a village in the administrative district of Gmina Połczyn-Zdrój, within Świdwin County, West Pomeranian Voivodeship, in north-western Poland.

See also 

 History of Pomerania

References

Villages in Świdwin County